The Campionato Italiano Rally (C.I.R.) (Italian Rally Championship) is the main rally championship, which takes place in Italy.

, the championship consists of eight rallies, all which take place on asphalt and gravel, and includes one of the oldest rallies in the world, the Rally Targa Florio, which was first run in 1906.

Any cars can be entered, except those that are used in the WRC. Super 2000 four-wheel drive cars with engines up to 2000cc, Group N cars, and Super 1600 cars are all allowed.

A few of these cars include:
 Peugeot 207 S2000
 Fiat Grande Punto Abarth
 Mitsubishi Lancer Evolution IX
 Renault Clio S1600

List of champions

See also
Rallying in Italy

References

External links
Official website

Rally racing series
Rally